Anier Boué (born April 3, 1984) is a Cuban javelin thrower. Shortly before the Olympics, he had won two gold medals in his category at the Central American and Caribbean Championships in Cali, Colombia, and also at the Ibero-American Championships in Iquique, Chile.

Boué represented Cuba at the 2008 Summer Olympics, where he competed in the men's javelin throw. He placed fifteenth for the first group, and twenty-eighth overall in the qualifying rounds, with a throw of 71.85 metres, failing to advance into the finals.
 
Boue threw his personal best of 80.53 metres at a national meet in his home city of Havana.

Personal best
Javelin throw: 80.53 m –  La Habana, 21 June 2007

Achievements

References

External links

NBC Olympics Profile

Living people
1984 births
Athletes from Havana
Cuban male javelin throwers
Olympic athletes of Cuba
Athletes (track and field) at the 2008 Summer Olympics
21st-century Cuban people